Ana Supriatna (born April 8, 1990) is an Indonesian footballer who plays for Barito Putera in the Indonesia Super League.

Honours

Club honours
Persib Bandung U-21
Indonesia Super League U-21 (1): 2009–10
Barito Putera
Liga Indonesia Premier Division (1): 2011-12

References

1990 births
Living people
Sundanese people
Liga 1 (Indonesia) players
PS Barito Putera players
Indonesian footballers
Association football midfielders
People from Garut Regency
Sportspeople from West Java